Serhiy Kostiantynovych Ionushas (born October 18, 1979, Leningrad, RSFSR) — politician, Ukrainian lawyer, patent attorney. People's Deputy of Ukraine of the 9th convocation. Head of Legal Reform Commission under the President of Ukraine.  Head of the Verkhovna Rada (Ukrainian Parliament) Committee on Law Enforcement.

Biography
Ionushas obtained Diploma of Lawyer with honours in the Yaroslav Mudryi National Law University.
He studied in the Ukrainian Institute of Industrial Property where he was obtained Master's Degree Diploma with honours and was qualified as a Specialist of Intellectual Property.
He also studied in the Institute of International Relations of the Taras Shevchenko National University of Kyiv under the program “Legislative stages in Ukraine: Kyiv and selected regions” in a major “European Law”.
He held executive positions in the law firms. 
He is a member of Ukrainian Bar Association, member of Ukrainian Advocates' Association, author of  publications and reports on the issue of the copyright protection and industrial property.
Ex Head of the law firm “Gelon”.

One of his clients was the Kvartal 95 Studio.

Political activity
In the 2019 Ukrainian presidential election Ionushas was a trustee of the candidate to the position of the President of Ukraine Volodymyr Zelensky. Member of ZeTeam (responsible for justice).
Candidate to the People's deputy from the party “Servant of the People” on the parliament's elections of 2019, No. 38 in the list (as a nonpartisan politician). During the election: individual entrepreneur, non-party. 
In 2019 was elected a People's Deputy of Ukraine, on 29 August took the oath at the meeting of the Verkhovna Rada.
Head of the Verkhovna Rada Committee on Law Enforcement. 
Member of the Legal Reform Commission from August 7, 2019. 
By decree of President Zelensky of October 29, 2020, he was appointed to the position of the head of the Law Reform Commission under the President of Ukraine.  
Member of the Commission for anticorruption policy from June 1, 2020.

References

External links

Servant of the People (political party) politicians
Ninth convocation members of the Verkhovna Rada
1979 births
Living people
Politicians from Kyiv
Yaroslav Mudryi National Law University alumni
Ukrainian people of Lithuanian descent